Edward Stanley may refer to:

Edward Stanley, 1st Baron Monteagle (c. 1460–1523), English soldier and peer
Edward Stanley, 3rd Earl of Derby (1509–1572), English nobleman
Edward Stanley (MP for Merioneth) (by 1513–64 or later), MP for Merioneth
Edward Stanley (MP for Flint Boroughs) (1521/22?–1609), MP for Flint Boroughs
Edward Stanley (1639–1664), Member of Parliament for Lancashire
Edward Stanley, 11th Earl of Derby (1689–1776), British peer and politician
Edward Stanley (bishop) (1779–1849), Bishop of Norwich
Edward Stanley (1790–1863), Member of Parliament for West Cumberland, 1832–1852
Edward Stanley (surgeon) (1793–1862), author of books on surgery, twice President of the Royal College of Surgeons of England
Edward Stanley, 2nd Baron Stanley of Alderley (1802–1869), British politician
Edward Stanley, 15th Earl of Derby (1826–1893), British statesman, twice Secretary of State for Foreign Affairs
Edward Stanley (Bridgwater MP) (1826–1907), Member of Parliament for West Somerset and Bridgwater
Edward Stanley, 4th Baron Stanley of Alderley (1839–1925), English educationalist
Edward Stanley (cricketer) (1852–1896), English cricketer
Edward Stanley, 17th Earl of Derby (1865–1948), British soldier, Conservative politician, diplomat and racehorse owner
Edward Stanley, Lord Stanley (died 1938) (1894–1938), British Conservative politician
Edward Stanley, 6th Baron Stanley of Alderley (1907–1971), English nobleman
Edward Stanley, 18th Earl of Derby (1918–1994), British peer
Edward Stanley, 19th Earl of Derby (born 1962), British peer
Edward Stanley, Lord Stanley (born 1998), son of the 19th Earl of Derby

See also
Edward Smith-Stanley (disambiguation), several people